One Last Thing... is a 2005 American comedy-drama film directed by Alex Steyermark and written by Barry Stringfellow. It was produced by HDNet Films, screened at the 2005 Toronto International Film Festival on September 12, 2005, and had a limited release in the United States on May 5, 2006, by Magnolia Pictures.

Plot
Dylan, a high school student with an inoperable brain tumor, lives with his widowed mother Carol in Marcus Hook, Pennsylvania. He is invited on television by a wish-granting organization and stuns viewers with his wish: he wants to spend a weekend alone with supermodel Nikki Sinclaire.

Living in New York City, Nikki is watching television and hears about Dylan's wish; she is convinced by her agent to see Dylan, as part of a publicity stunt to improve Nikki's image, but her visit is very brief. Dylan is disappointed and decides to raise money and travel to New York, trying to see Nikki again.

Carol struggles with allowing her sick son (traveling with two friends) to be unsupervised in an unfamiliar city. Nikki has her own problems and is reluctant to even speak to Dylan.

Striking out and growing sicker, Dylan and his friends take a cab back to Pennsylvania, and eventually to the hospital. Surprisingly, Nikki shows up and, at his request, takes Dylan to the beach. They spend the day together talking, fishing, and kissing, eventually falling asleep on a blanket.

In the morning, Nikki discovers that Dylan has died. Nikki attends his funeral with friends and family. As he enters the afterlife, Dylan arrives on the beach to see his father, who died years before, fishing. He invites Dylan to join him. Dylan asks his father how he knows this is not a dream. His father replies, "You don't, and you never will".

Cast
Michael Angarano as Dylan Jameison
Cynthia Nixon as Carol Jameison
Sunny Mabrey as Nikki Sinclaire
Gina Gershon as Arlene
Johnny Messner as Jason O'Malley
Wyclef Jean as Emmett Ducasse
Gideon Glick as Slap
Matt Bush as Ricky
Richie Rich as Himself
Michael Rispoli as Babba
Ethan Hawke as Earl Jameison, Dylan's father (uncredited)

Release
The region 1 DVD was released on May 23, 2006.

External links
 
 
 

2005 films
2005 comedy-drama films
2000s American films
2000s English-language films
American comedy-drama films
Films about cancer
Films about wish fulfillment
Films scored by Anton Sanko
Films set in New York City
Films set in Pennsylvania
Magnolia Pictures films
Publicity stunts in fiction